In molecular biology, SNORA8 (also known as ACA8) is a member of the H/ACA class of small nucleolar RNA that guide the sites of modification of uridines to pseudouridines.

References

External links 
 

Small nuclear RNA